The 174th Massachusetts General Court, consisting of the Massachusetts Senate and the Massachusetts House of Representatives, met in 1985 and 1986 during the governorship of Michael Dukakis. William Bulger served as president of the Senate and George Keverian served as speaker of the House.

Notable legislation included the Safe Roads Act.

Senators

Representatives

See also
 99th United States Congress
 List of Massachusetts General Courts

References

Further reading

External links
 
 
 
 
 
 
  (1964-1994)

Political history of Massachusetts
Massachusetts legislative sessions
massachusetts
1985 in Massachusetts
massachusetts
1986 in Massachusetts